The men's individual golf event at the 2020 Summer Olympics was held from 29 July to 1 August 2021 at the Kasumigaseki Country Club. 60 golfers from 35 nations competed in the event, which was won by Xander Schauffele of the United States.

Background
The first Olympic golf tournaments took place at the second modern Games in Paris 1900. Men's and women's events were held. Golf was featured again at the next Games, St. Louis 1904 with men's events (an individual tournament as well as a team event). The 1908 Games in London were also supposed to have a golf competition, but a dispute led to a boycott by all of the host nation's golfers, leaving only a single international competitor and resulting in the cancellation of the event. Golf would disappear from the Olympic programme from then until returning to the 2016 Summer Olympics in Rio de Janeiro.

Qualification

Each country could qualify from one to four golfers based on the World Rankings of 21 June 2021. The top 60 golfers, subject to limits per nation and guarantees for the host and continental representation, were selected. A nation could have three or four golfers if they are all in the top 15 of the rankings; otherwise, each nation was limited to two golfers. One spot was guaranteed for the host nation Japan and five spots were guaranteed to ensure that each Olympic continent has at least one representative.

Competition format
Following the format used when golf was returned to the Olympic programme in 2016, the tournament is a four-round stroke play tournament, with the lowest score over the total 72 holes winning.

Schedule
As with most major stroke play tournaments, the event is held over four days (Thursday through Sunday) with each golfer playing one round (18 holes) per day.

All times are Japan Standard Time (UTC+9)

Results

First round
Thursday, 29 July 2021

Austria's Sepp Straka birdied three consecutive holes on his back-nine and finished with a bogey-free round of 63 (−8) to take the first-round lead. A shot behind was Jazz Janewattananond of Thailand, who also did not make a bogey in a seven-under round of 64. Belgium's Thomas Pieters holed out from the fairway for eagle on the par-four 11th hole and shot 65, tied with Carlos Ortiz in third place and two shots behind.

Reigning Open champion Collin Morikawa, at World No. 3 the highest-ranked player in the field, opened with 69 (−2). Masters champion Hideki Matsuyama was four-under on his round through eight holes but made two bogeys to fall back to two-under.

Second round
Friday, 30 July 2021
Saturday, 31 July 2021

Thunderstorms caused delays in play and 16 players did not complete the second round on Friday. American Xander Schauffele was the overnight leader after shooting an 8-under-par 63. He held a one stroke lead over Carlos Ortiz of Mexico.

Third round
Saturday, 31 July 2021

Final round
Sunday, 1 August 2021

Pan Cheng-tsung won the bronze medal after a seven-man sudden death playoff after Collin Morikawa was eliminated by par on the fourth extra hole. Rory McIlroy, Sebastián Muñoz, and Mito Pereira were all eliminated by birdie on the third extra hole, and Paul Casey and Hideki Matsuyama were both eliminated by par on the first extra hole.

The medals for the competition were presented by Sir Craig Reedie, United Kingdom; IOC Member, and the medalists' bouquets were presented by Jay Monahan, United States; IGF Chairman.

References

External links
Tokyo 2020 – Golf – Olympic Schedule & Results 

Men
Men's events at the 2020 Summer Olympics